Beneath is the fifth album by Finnish heavy metal band Amoral. The American release date was 14 February 2012. It was released in Europe by Imperial Cassette in 2011 and the US edition was released by The End Records in 2012 .

Beneath is produced by Janne Saksa & Ben Varon. It is recorded by Janne Saksa and Amoral at Sound Supreme Studios, Hämeenlinna(FI) in February 2011. It is mixed by Janne Saksa and mastered by Svante Forsbäck at Chartmakers Studios, Helsinki(FI). Arrangements are by Amoral. Programming on "Beneath" was made by Mikko P. Mustonen and programming on "Wastelands" by Janne Saksa.

Music and lyrics
Music and Lyrics are by Ben Varon, except "This Ever Ending Game" and "Hours Of Simplicity", which are by Masi Hukari & Ben Varon. Additional backing vocals are by Janne Saksa.

Artwork
Artwork and layout of the album is by Spanish artist Marta Nael. Artwork concept is made by Ben Varon. Photography is by Valtteri Hirvonen. Amoral Skull logo is made by Aki Siltala.

The Japan edition

The Japan edition was out on 19 October 2011 via Marquee Avalon before the  European edition which was released 26 October 2011. 14 February 2012 Beneath was finally released in the US and in Mexico it was published 15 February. In Russia it was out 27 March 2012 via Fono Records.

Beneath continued on the path Amoral started with ”Show Your Colors”. The emphasis is still on solid songwriting, big hooks, new arrangements and guitar riffs, but the scale is wider than before: From 9-minute epics ”Beneath” to straightforward rock songs ”Silhouette” and ”Same Difference”, to nods to the band's death metal past ”(Won't Go) Home” and ”Staying Human” and talks between acoustic guitars and industrial landscapes in ”Wastelands”.

The first single Same Difference was released in the beginning of summer 2011. The second single Silhouette was played first time on Radio Rock (FI) in October 2011 and was followed by a video. Silhouette has both electric and acoustic versions, from which the acoustic one is the original. The second video was made from the punk rock oriented track Wrapped In Barbwire, which pays obeisance to Guns N' Roses video "Garden of Eden".

The album was ranked by public voting as the fourth best domestic metal album at the Finnish Metal Awards 2011 and the cover art reached the fifth place.

Reviews of Beneath.

Track listing

Personnel

 Ari Koivunen - vocals
 Ben Varon - guitars & backing vocals, songwriting and lyrics
 Juhana Karlsson - drums
 Masi Hukari - guitars and songwriting
 Pekka Johansson - bass

References

Amoral (band) albums
2011 albums